Beautiful Bismark is a 1913 American silent short drama film starring William Garwood. It was released by Mutual Films.

External links

1913 drama films
1913 films
Silent American drama films
American silent short films
American black-and-white films
1913 short films
1910s American films
1910s English-language films
American drama short films